The 1971 Benson & Hedges Centennial Open was a combined men's and women's tennis tournament played on outdoor grass courts at the Stanley Street Courts in Auckland, New Zealand from 7 March to 13 March 1971. It was a non-tour event, i.e. not part of one of the main men's or women's circuits that year. Bob Carmichael and Margaret Court won the singles titles.

Finals

Men's singles

 Bob Carmichael defeated  Allan Stone 7–6, 7–6, 6–3
 It was Carmichael's 3rd title of the year and the 4th of his career.

Women's singles
 Margaret Court defeated  Evonne Goolagong 3–6, 7–6(5–1), 6–2

Men's doubles
 Bob Carmichael /  Ray Ruffels defeated  Brian Fairlie /  Raymond Moore 6–3, 6–7, 6–4, 4–6, 6–3
 It was Carmichael's 2nd title of the year and the 3rd of his career. It was Ruffels's only title of the year and the 4th of his career.

Women's doubles
 Margaret Court /  Evonne Goolagong defeated  Lesley Bowrey /  Winnie Shaw 7–6, 6–0

References

External links
 ATP tournament profile

Heineken Open
ATP Auckland Open
1971 Grand Prix (tennis)
March 1971 sports events in New Zealand